Leonhard Freisinger (February 7, 1916 – August 29, 1985) was an American speed skater who competed at the 1936 Winter Olympics. He won a bronze medal in the 500 m and placed fourth in the 1500 m event. He won the U.S. National Indoor title in 1937 and 1938 and the National and North American Outdoor title in 1940. In 1938 he set a world record over 500 m at a meet in Davos, Switzerland, but Hans Engnestangen beat this record a few minuted later. Freisinger was selected for the 1940 Olympics, but they were canceled due to World War II. Later he became a figure skater in professional ice shows, and coached the 1964 American Olympic speed skating team.

References

1916 births
1985 deaths
American male speed skaters
Speed skaters at the 1936 Winter Olympics
Olympic bronze medalists for the United States in speed skating
Medalists at the 1936 Winter Olympics